Jose V. Lopez is an American-Filipino molecular biologist. He has been faculty and professor of biology at Nova Southeastern University (NSU). in Dania Beach FL since 2007. Lopez co-founded the Global Invertebrate Genomics Alliance (GIGA), a community of scientists. He has also participated in the Porifera Tree of Life, Earth Microbiome and Earth BioGenome Projects.

Education
Lopez obtained his bachelor's degree at the Georgia Institute of Technology. He later earned a Master of Science degree focused on molecular biology at the Florida State University and his doctorate in Environmental Biology and Public Policy at George Mason University in Fairfax. His doctoral dissertation involved the characterization of transpositions of mitochondrial DNA into the nuclei of cats and the naming of NUMT (nuclear mitochondrial DNAs) as a common evolutionary genomics phenomenon. Subsequent work has involved the application of molecular genetics to symbiosis and marine biology research (e.g. corals and sponges)

Career 
Lopez applied his molecular evolutionary training in postdoctoral appointments with Nancy Knowlton, characterizing the Orbicella (formerly Montastraea) annularis coral sibling species complex at the Smithsonian Tropical Research Institute in Panama, and marine sponge genetics with Shirley Pomponi at Harbor Branch Oceanographic Institute in Ft Pierce. The latter allowed him to use Johnson Sea-Link submersible technology to investigate deep sea sponges and corals. Lopez's research on marine sponges has been featured in a South Florida PBS documentary "Sponges: are they the oldest animal in the sea?" on ChangingSeas TV. While at NSU's Halmos College of Natural Sciences and Oceanography, his laboratory has applied genomics tools to address various specific questions in marine invertebrate-microbial symbiosis, microbiome ecology, genomics, forensics, metagenomics of oil-exposed organisms, conservation genomics and systematics/phylogenetics. Lopez was part of the Deep Pelagic Nekton Dynamics (DEEPEND) Consortium of the Gulf of Mexico led by marine biologist Tracey T. Sutton to better understand food webs and pelagic microbial distributions in the deep Gulf of Mexico after the Deepwater Horizon oil spill. Lopez has served as an associate editor for the Journal of Heredity since 2008. In 2018, he was awarded an NSU President's Distinguished Professor Award.

Lopez co-founded the Global Invertebrate Genomics Alliance (GIGA), which seeks to promote research and student training into the genomics of marine and aquatic invertebrate animals. After some initial consultations with geneticist Stephen J. O'Brien, and seeing the success of the first whole genome sequencing project, Genomes10K, Lopez moved to form GIGA in 2013. This involved reaching out to a diverse community of invertebrate biologists, who mostly supported the concept. Support to fund a maiden workshop was provided by the American Genetics Association. GIGA focuses mostly on aquatic animals, but has similar problems (relatively inaccessible, small individual animals, low input DNA for sequencing) to the larger invertebrate consortium, Insect5K (i5K). Both GIGA and i5K now help comprise a "network of networks" as part of the Earth BioGenome Project (EBP) launched in December 2018 to try to sequence the whole genomes of 1.5 million eukaryotes.

Besides the well-known symbiosis, Lopez initially hypothesized that sponge microbiomes could serve as indicators for the communities in their immediate seawater environment, since sponges are filter feeders. This hypothesis was later proven to be only partially correct (see the high vs low microbial abundance classification of sponges – HMA, LMA), as growing evidence indicated that many sponge species carry their own adapted symbionts. 

Lopez applied the culture-independent molecular tools that arose from the Woese revolution of ribosomal RNA-based bacterial systematics. Eventually molecular identifications expanded to local marine ecosystems as predictors of water quality, human skin microbiomes as possible forensic tools, Myotis bat feces to test for potential microbiome effects on longevity, and the Lake Okeechobee watershed of Florida.

Personal life 
Lopez's parents are University of Philippines graduates, clinical pathologist Ernesto G. and Rosario Lopez, who first met each other in Binghamton New York. He is married to Amy Doyle of Plantation FL.

References

External links 
 The Global Invertebrate Genomics Alliance

American molecular biologists
Year of birth missing (living people)
Living people
Georgia Tech alumni
George Mason University alumni
Florida State University alumni